The Hill–Carrillo Adobe, also known as Carrillo Adobe is a historic structure in Santa Barbara, California. Built in 1825 and 1826, it was listed on the National Register of Historic Places in 1986. It is also registered as a California Historical Landmark site (#721) as well.

It is a U-shaped building consisting of original rectangular 1825–1826 section that faces the street and two wings added in the 1900s. It was built by Daniel Hill, originally from Billerica, Massachusetts.

References

Adobe buildings and structures in California
Houses in Santa Barbara County, California
Houses completed in 1825
California Historical Landmarks
Houses on the National Register of Historic Places in California
National Register of Historic Places in Santa Barbara County, California
1825 in Alta California